The All-Union Council on Physical Culture and Sports was a main body of Soviet executive power in physical culture and sports originally established in August 1920 as part of the Soviet vsevobuch (Main directorate of General Military Education of the Russian People's Commissariat on War). 

In 1936 it was transformed into an All-Union committee and a State committee.

At first it was established as interdepartamental commission that included representatives of Vseobuch, People's Commissariat of Enlightenment, People's Commissariat of Healthcare, trade unions, Russian League of Communist Youth (RKSM, later known as Komsomol), and sports-gymnastics societies. It also was a consultative agency to Vseobuch. Since 1923 and until 1936 it was a special agency of the Central Executive Committee of the Soviet Union.

Its main duties included
 development and review of programs, provisions, regulations, and guidelines on physical education;
 organization and holding of sports competitions;
 general management of sports organizations;
 preparation of physical culture cadres (staff);
 monitoring of the physical education of students;
 medical control over the health of those engaged in physical culture and sports.

All-Union Council on Physical Culture

On 1 April 1936, the All-Union council on Physical Culture was transformed into the All-Union Committee on Physical Culture and Sports in 1936–1953 and 1954–1959. The first chairman of the committee was appointed Nikolai Antipov.

After 1968 it was known as Sportkomitet and Goskomsport.

In 1953–1954 it was part of the Ministry of Healthcare and in 1959–1968 it was governed by the Union of Sports Societies and Organizations (SSOO).

Notes

References

External links
 All-Union Council on physical culture. History of sports and physical culture.
 Governors of the main Russian sports agency throughout full history of its existence (Руководители главного российского спортивного ведомства за всю историю его существования). Contemporary museum of sports.

Physical Culture And Sports